Linda Elder is an American educational psychologist, author and president of the Foundation for Critical Thinking. She is currently an executive director of the Center for Critical Thinking.  Elder is best known for her work on critical thinking development and thoughts including SEE-I.

Early life and career
Elder started her career for a non-profit organization, Youth Services in 1983 to deal with youth for juvenile detention. She completed her master's degree in psychology in 1988 and her PhD in 1992 from the University of Memphis. Elder started her academic career at the college level, where she served as a Professor and got introduced to the critical thinking initially. She subsequently started studying critical thinking, primarily to teach the subject at a deeper level to the students.

In 1992, she was introduced to the work of Richard Paul and the Foundation for Critical Thinking, located in California. Elder joined the Center and Foundation for Critical Thinking in 1994, focused primarily on the relationship between cognition and affect. Later in the same year, she developed an original stage theory of critical thinking development, which was later expanded along with Richard Paul in 1995. She has written, with coauthor Richard Paul, 23 thinker's guides to critical thinking and four books, which provided her the early success. Later in 1997, she was the primary researcher for the California Teacher Preparation for Instruction in Critical Thinking: Research Findings and Policy Recommendations. The Journal of Developmental Education offered her a quarterly column on critical thinking, where she writes regularly.

Research topics
Elder's work has focused primary on the barriers to critical thinking development, closely to egocentric and sociocentric thought.  She had explained ethnocentricity as a form of sociocentricity, since, on her view, sociocentrism refers to all forms of group pathologies in thought, and therefore goes beyond those pathologies that arise out of ethnicity. Her work has been influenced by the writings of Peter Singer, Jane Goodall, and Roger Fouts. Elder has focused on the conceptual relationship between cognition and affect, thinking, feeling and motivation and has challenged common factors for the relationships between reason and emotion.

Bibliography
Elder has written books mostly on Critical Thinking with co-author Richard Paul.

References

External links
 Dr. Linda Elder, The Critical Thinking Community

American women psychologists
21st-century American psychologists
University of Memphis alumni
Year of birth missing (living people)
Living people
21st-century American women